Ribonuclease A family member k6 is a protein that in humans is encoded by the RNASE6 gene.

Function

The protein encoded by this gene is a member of the ribonuclease A superfamily and functions in the urinary tract. The protein has broad-spectrum antimicrobial activity against pathogenic bacteria. [provided by RefSeq, Nov 2014].

References

Further reading